is a junction railway station in the city of Yamagata, Yamagata Prefecture, Japan, operated by East Japan Railway Company (JR East).

Lines
Uzen-Chitose Station is served by the Ōu Main Line, and is located 91.9 rail kilometers from the terminus of the line at Fukushima Station. It is also served by the Senzan Line and is 58.0 rail kilometers from the terminus of that line at Sendai Station.

Station layout
The station is an elevated station with a single island platform, with the station building located on the footbridge connecting the platform with the street on either side. The station is unattended.

Platforms

History
Uzen-Chitose Station opened on October 17, 1933. The station was absorbed into the JR East network upon the privatization of JNR on April 1, 1987. The station building was rebuilt in December 1999.

Surrounding area
 Yamagata Big Wing Convention center
 Yamagata General Sports Arena

External links

 JR East Station information 

Railway stations in Yamagata Prefecture
Ōu Main Line
Senzan Line
Railway stations in Japan opened in 1933
Stations of East Japan Railway Company
Yamagata, Yamagata